The 1884 United States presidential election in Maine took place on November 4, 1884, as part of the 1884 United States presidential election. Voters chose six representatives, or electors to the Electoral College, who voted for president and vice president.

Maine voted for the Republican nominee, James G. Blaine, over the Democratic nominee, Grover Cleveland. Blaine won his home state by a margin of 15.37%.

Results

Results by county

See also
 United States presidential elections in Maine

Notes

References

Maine
1884
1884 Maine elections